Chundawats are a Rajput clan and were powerful chiefs in the Mewar region during the 1700s. They are the descendants of the 15th century Mewari prince Chunda Sisodia, the eldest son of Rana Lakha. Having surrendered his right to the throne to his younger brother Mokal Singh, Chunda gained for his descendants the right to advise the reigning Rana on matters of State as well as an exalted position on the royal council.

References 

Rajput clans of Rajasthan